Living on the Edge (full title Living on the Edge, the Poetic Works of Gérald Leblanc also known by its French language title L'extrême frontière, l'oeuvre poétique de Gérald Leblanc) is a 2005 documentary film by Canadian director of Acadian origin Rodrigue Jean. In this documentary, Rodrigue Jean pays tribute to his Acadian roots, focussing on the poetry of Gérald Leblanc.

Synopsis
A child of the Beat Generation, Gérald Leblanc conjoined urban-ness and American-ness, wandering and belonging, far beyond the boundaries of taboo. In so doing, he helped propel Acadia into the modern era.

References

External links
NFB page for Living on the Edge (English)
ONF page for L'extrême frontière

2005 films
Canadian documentary films
Films directed by Rodrigue Jean
National Film Board of Canada documentaries
2005 documentary films
Documentary films about poets
French-language Canadian films
2000s Canadian films
2000s French-language films